Behningia is a genus of sand-burrowing mayfly in the family Behningiidae. There are at least four described species in Behningia.

Species
These four species belong to the genus Behningia:
 Behningia baei McCafferty & Jacobus, 2006
Behningia nujiangensis Zhou & Bisset, 2019
 Behningia tschernovae Edmunds & Traver, 1959
 Behningia ulmeri Lestage, 1929

References

Mayflies
Articles created by Qbugbot